Oceaniopteris gibba, the miniature tree fern (syn. Blechnum gibbum), is a tropical species of fern in the family Blechnaceae, native to New Caledonia and introduced in Fiji.  It has received the Royal Horticultural Society's Award of Garden Merit. 

With a vertical "trunk" (actually a rhizome), it has bright green fronds. As it does not tolerate temperatures below , in temperate zones it must be cultivated under glass all year round. It is a suitable subject for a greenhouse or conservatory. It requires an acid soil and a partially shaded position.

References

Blechnaceae
Ferns of Oceania